Kenneth Edward Roberts (3 June 1925 – 21 October 2008) was an Australian rules footballer who played with Richmond in the Victorian Football League (VFL).

Prior to playing with Richmond, Roberts served in the Australian Army during World War II.

Notes

External links 

1925 births
2008 deaths
Australian rules footballers from Melbourne
Richmond Football Club players
People from Richmond, Victoria
Australian Army personnel of World War II
Military personnel from Melbourne